Cheraw Historic District is a national historic district located at Cheraw, Chesterfield County, South Carolina.  The district encompasses 39 contributing buildings and 1 contributing object in Cheraw. Located within the district are varieties of architectural styles that include the early frame homes of the 1800s (often called upcountry farmhouses, or essentially I-House in type), antebellum structures with Classical Revival details and Greek Revival porticos, and Victorian houses from the turn of the 20th century. The district also includes several churches, a cemetery, and the towns’ original boundary markers dating from 1766.  Notable buildings include Town Hall, First Presbyterian Church, St. Peter's Catholic Church, Chicola Club / Brady's Restaurant, First Federal Savings, Robert Smalls, Dizzy Gillespie and Loan, B.C. Moore and Sons, Coulter Memorial Academy Building, and Godfrey House. Located in the district is the separately listed St. David's Episcopal Church and Cemetery.

It was listed on the National Register of Historic Places in 1974.

References

External links

Historic districts on the National Register of Historic Places in South Carolina
Buildings and structures in Chesterfield County, South Carolina
National Register of Historic Places in Chesterfield County, South Carolina